Hippotion paukstadti is a moth of the  family Sphingidae. It is found in Indonesia.

References

 Pinhey, E (1962): Hawk Moths of Central and Southern Africa. Longmans Southern Africa, Cape Town.

Hippotion
Moths described in 1995